Jean-Paul-Alban Villeneuve-Bargemont (8 August 1784, in Saint-Auban – 8 June 1850, in Paris) was a French politician and parliamentary leader of the Legitimists.

References

1784 births
1850 deaths
French politicians
French monarchists
Members of the Académie des sciences morales et politiques